Leaf is an unincorporated community in White County, Georgia, United States.

History
A post office called Leaf was established in 1897, and remained in operation until 1952. The origin of the name "Leaf" is obscure.

References

Unincorporated communities in White County, Georgia
Unincorporated communities in Georgia (U.S. state)